Gobeyr is a village in Khuzestan Province, Iran.

Gobeyr may also refer to:
 Gobeyr 1
 Gobeyr 2
 Gobeyr 3
 Gobeyr-e Zahir